Monfortinho is a former civil parish in the municipality of Idanha-a-Nova, Portugal. In 2013, the parish merged into the new parish Monfortinho e Salvaterra do Extremo. It covers an area of 53.2 km2 and had a population of 608 as of 2001.

References

Spa towns in Portugal
Idanha-a-Nova
Portugal–Spain border crossings